Laudermarke is a hamlet in the Dutch province of Groningen. It is a part of the municipality of Westerwolde, and lies about 19 km northeast of Emmen.

Laudermarke has about 30 houses.

The hamlet was first mentioned in as 1466 Lauder marke, and means "fenced off terrain belonging to Laude. The postal authorities have placed it under Ter Apel.

References

External links 
 

Populated places in Groningen (province)
Westerwolde (municipality)